The 2018 Women's Hockey World Cup was the 14th edition of the  Women's Hockey World Cup, a field hockey tournament. It was held from 21 July to 5 August 2018 at the Lee Valley Hockey and Tennis Centre in London, England.

Defending champions the Netherlands won the tournament for an eighth time after defeating Ireland 6–0 in the final, who claimed their first World Cup medal. Spain won the third place match by defeating Australia 3–1 to claim their first World Cup medal as well.

Bidding
In March 2013, one month after the FIH published the Event Assignment Process Document for the 2014–2018 cycle, Australia, Belgium, England and New Zealand were shortlisted as candidates for hosting the event and were demanded to submit bidding documentation, requirement that eventually Belgium did not meet. In addition one month before the host election, Australia withdrew their application due to technical and financial reasons. England was announced as host on 7 November 2013 during a special ceremony in Lausanne, Switzerland.

Venue
Also chosen to host the 2015 EuroHockey Nations Championship for men and women, the tournament will be held at the Lee Valley Hockey and Tennis Centre within the Queen Elizabeth Olympic Park in London, England. This venue is part of the legacy from the 2012 Summer Olympics as the Riverbank Arena, where the field hockey events took place, which was scaled down and moved to its current location at Lee Valley Park.

Qualification
Due to the increase to 16 participating teams, the new qualification process was announced in July 2015 by the International Hockey Federation. Each of the continental champions from five confederations and the host nation received an automatic berth. In addition, the 10/11 highest placed teams at the Semifinals of the 2016–17 FIH Hockey World League not already qualified entered the tournament. The following sixteen teams, shown with final pre-tournament rankings, competed in this tournament.

Format
The 16 teams were drawn into four groups, each containing four teams. Each team played each other team in its group once. The first-placed team in each group advanced to the quarterfinals, while the second- and third-placed teams in each group go into the crossover matches. From there on a single-elimination tournament was played.

Squads

Umpires
15 umpires were appointed by the FIH for this tournament.

Amber Church (NZL)
Laurine Delforge (BEL)
Carolina De La Fuente (ARG)
Maggie Giddens (USA)
Kelly Hudson (NZL)
Michelle Joubert (RSA)
Alison Keogh (IRL)
Liu Xiaoying (CHN)
Ayanna McClean (TTO)
Michelle Meister (GER)
Aleisha Neumann (AUS)
Irene Presenqui (ARG)
Annelize Rostron (RSA)
Sarah Wilson (SCO)
Emi Yamada (JPN)

Results
The schedule was published on 26 November 2017.

All times are British Summer Time (UTC+1).

First round

Pool A

Pool B

Pool C

Pool D

Second round

Crossover

Quarterfinals

Semifinals

Third place game

Final

Final ranking

Goalscorers

Awards

References

External links

Official website

 
2018
2018 in women's field hockey
International women's field hockey competitions hosted by England
2018 in English women's sport
2018 sports events in London
July 2018 sports events in the United Kingdom